Alexander Dolgov may refer to:
 Aleksandr Dolgov, Russian footballer
 Alexander Dolgov (physicist)